Cargo is a small village near the River Eden on the Solway Plain. The name Cargo reflects a combination of two languages; from the Celtic word carreg meaning "rock"  and from the Old Norse word  haugr meaning  "hill". Circa 1870, it had a population of 262 as recorded in the Imperial Gazetteer of England and Wales.

See also

Listed buildings in Kingmoor

References

External links
  Cumbria County History Trust: Stanwix (nb: provisional research only - see Talk page)

Villages in Cumbria
City of Carlisle